Mordellistena corvina is a beetle in the genus Mordellistena of the family Mordellidae. It was described in 1950 by Ermisch.

References

corvina
Beetles described in 1950